Silvertoner is the debut studio album by Swedish singer Sanna Nielsen, released in September 1996. Nielsen was 11 at the time, turning 12 on November 27, 1996. The album contains her debut single "Till en fågel", which peaked at number 46 on the Swedish Singles Chart in 1996. The album peaked at number 55 on the Swedish Albums Chart.

Track listing
När jag hör honom spela för vinden
Mamma häng me' mej ut i kväll
Maria Maria
Thimmy
Till en fågel
Bilder i mitt album
Teddybjörnen Fredriksson (duet with Lasse Berghagen)
En varsam hand
Änglafin
Leka med vinden
Mötet
Har jag chansen på dej
Kära dagbok
Viva, Fernando Garcia
En gång när jag blir stor

Charts

References

External links
http://www.discogs.com/Sanna-Nielsen-Silvertoner/master/674756

1996 debut albums
Sanna Nielsen albums
Swedish-language albums